Roland Juno-Gi is a music workstation/synth introduced in 2010 by Roland Corporation. As an installment in the long-running Juno series, the synthesizer is the successor to the Juno-G.

Features
The Juno-Gi is a 128-voice polyphony keyboard that contains about 1,300 sounds and an eight-track digital recorder with guitar, microphone and line inputs. USB memory, MIDI file format (SMF/MP3/WAV/AIFF), and D-Beam control are included.

References

External links
 Roland - Roland US official site
 Musician's Friend review for JUNO-Gi (archive.org)

Juno-Gi
Music workstations
D-Beam
Polyphonic synthesizers
Digital synthesizers
Japanese inventions